A litter is the live birth of multiple offspring at one time in animals from the same mother and usually from one set of parents, particularly from three to eight offspring. The word is most often used for the offspring of mammals, but can be used for any animal that gives birth to multiple young. In comparison, a group of eggs and the offspring that hatch from them are frequently called a clutch, while young birds are often called a brood. Animals from the same litter are referred to as litter-mates.

Litter
A species' average litter size is generally equal to one half of the number of teats and the maximum litter size generally matches the number of teats. Not all species abide by this rule, however. The naked mole rat, for example, averages roughly eleven young per birth and has eleven teats.

Animals frequently display grouping behavior in herds, swarms, flocks, or colonies, and these multiple births derive similar advantages. A litter offers some protection from predation, not particularly to the individual young but to the parents' investment in breeding. With multiple young, predators could eat several and others could still survive to reach maturity, but with only one offspring, its loss could mean a wasted breeding season. The other significant advantage is the chance for the healthiest young animals to be favored from a group. Rather than it being a conscious decision on the part of the parents, the fittest and strongest baby competes most successfully for food and space, leaving the weakest young, or runts, to die through lack of care.

In the wild, only a small percentage, if any, of the litter may survive to maturity, whereas for domesticated animals and those in captivity with human care the whole litter almost always survives. Kittens and puppies are in this group. Carnivorans, rodents, and pigs usually have litters, while primates and larger herbivores usually have singletons.

References

Zoology
Reproduction
Multiple births
Animals by adaptation